Orveh-ye Vosta (also Romanized as ‘Orveh-ye Vosţá; also known as ‘Orveh) is a village in Olya Tayeb Rural District, in the Central District of Landeh County, Kohgiluyeh and Boyer-Ahmad Province, Iran. At the 2006 census, its population was 159, in 27 families.

References 

Populated places in Landeh County